Saint-Saturnin (Auvergnat: Sant Saturnin) is a commune in the Cantal department in south-central France. Its 12th century church is a listed monument.

Population

See also
Communes of the Cantal department

References

Communes of Cantal
Cantal communes articles needing translation from French Wikipedia